The 1967 Scottish League Cup final was played on 28 October 1967 at Hampden Park in Glasgow and was the final of the 22nd Scottish League Cup competition. The final was contested by Dundee and Celtic, with Dundee becoming the first side from outside the Old Firm to reach a League Cup final since 1963. Celtic won a high-scoring match by 5–3, with Stevie Chalmers, John Hughes, Bobby Lennox and Willie Wallace all scoring for Celtic. George McLean and Jim McLean scored Dundee's goals.

Match details

External links 

 Soccerbase

1967
League Cup Final
Scottish League Cup Final 1967
Scottish League Cup Final 1967
1960s in Glasgow